Tuija is a feminine Finnish given name. Notable people with the name include:

Tuija Brax (born 1965), Finnish politician
Tuija Hakkila (born 1959), Finnish classical pianist
Tuija Helander (born 1961), Finnish hurdler
Tuija Hyyrynen (born 1988), Finnish footballer
Tuija Kinnunen (born 1965), Finnish cyclist
Tuija Lehtinen (born 1954), Finnish writer
Tuija Lindström (born 1950), Finnish-Swedish photographer and artist
Tuija Toivonen (born 1958), Finnish long-distance runner

Finnish feminine given names